A special election was held in Puerto Rico in 1951. These were organized to select the delegates of that would participate in the Constitutional Convention held the same year.

References

Elections in Puerto Rico
1951 in Puerto Rico
1951 elections in the Caribbean